Atrocenta is a genus of moths belonging to the subfamily Tortricinae of the family Tortricidae. It consists of only one species, Atrocenta centrata, which is found in Ecuador (Tungurahua Province).

The ground colour of the forewings is cream, suffused with reddish rust in the dorsoposterior and median areas of the wing and with pale brownish suffusions between the veins in the subcostal area. The hindwings are cream, tinged with pale brownish near the apex and with grey strigulation.

Etymology
The generic name is an anagram of the name of the type-species. The specific name refers to the shape of the transtilla and is derived from Greek kentrotos (meaning provided with a thorn).

See also
List of Tortricidae genera

References

External links

Euliini
Endemic fauna of Ecuador
Moths of South America
Monotypic moth genera
Taxa named by Józef Razowski